Maysam Muhsen Saeed Abu-Khashabeh (born 18 May 1993) is a Jordanian footballer who plays as a forward. She has been a member of the Jordan women's national team.

International career
Abu-Khashabeh capped for Jordan at senior level during the 2014 AFC Women's Asian Cup qualification.

Personal life
Abu-Khashabeh is Muslim.

References

External links

1993 births
Living people
Sportspeople from Amman
Jordanian women's footballers
Women's association football forwards
Jordan women's international footballers
Jordanian Muslims